Cranendonck is a municipality in the southern Netherlands.
Though located in North Brabant near Eindhoven, the spoken dialect is Budels (linguistically a West Limburgish dialect), rather than Kempenlands (linguistically an East Brabantian dialect).

Population centres

Topography

Dutch topographic map of the municipality of Cranendonck, June 2015

Notable people 

 Antonius Mathijsen (1805 in Budel – 1878) a Dutch army surgeon who first used plaster of Paris
 Hans Teeuwen (born 1967 in Budel) a Dutch comedian, musician, actor and occasional filmmaker
 Sylvia Hoeks (born 1983 in Maarheeze) a Dutch actress and former model

Sport 
 Toine van Mierlo (born 1957 in Soerendonk) a retired Dutch footballer with 230 club caps 
 Craig Osaikhwuwuomwan (born 1990 in Budel) a Dutch professional basketball player
 Yvon Beliën  (born 1993 in Budel) is a Dutch volleyball player, helped the Netherlands reach their first Olympic semifinals at the 2016 Summer Olympics

Gallery

References

External links

Official website

 
Municipalities of North Brabant
Municipalities of the Netherlands established in 1998